Epiclines is a genus of beetles in the subfamily Clerinae. It is a monotypic genus containing only the species E. gayi.

References 

 

Monotypic Cucujiformia genera
Cleridae genera
Clerinae